Mark Erickson may refer to:

 Mark Erickson, member of the band Fog (band)
 Mark H. Erickson, president of Wittenberg University, 2005–2012